Rita Ackermann (born April 19, 1968) is a Hungarian-American artist. She is living and working in New York City.

Early life
Ackermann studied at the University of Fine Arts Budapest from 1989 until 1992. In 1992, Ackermann moved to New York City to study at The New York Studio School of Drawing, Painting and Sculpture through the Hanes Family Foundation. Upon arriving in New York, the artist, who was originally “Rita Bakos,” changed her name to “Rita Ackermann,” her grandmother’s maiden name.

Career

In 1994, Ackermann was commissioned by The New Museum to create a faux stained-glass window titled Who Are We? Where Did We Come From?. That same year, she had her first solo exhibition at Andrea Rosen Gallery in New York City which was reviewed in Artforum by critic Keith Seward. In 1999, Ackermann mounted her first institutional exhibition at The Swiss Institute in New York. In 2002, she had a solo exhibition of paintings, collage and works on paper titled Snowfall in August at Museum Het Domein in the Netherlands. From 2006-2008 Ackermann worked exclusively in collage, resulting in a series of works she compressed between two vertical sheets of Plexiglas. Ackermann participated in the 2008 Whitney Biennial. In 2011 her collaboration with filmmaker Harmony Korine titled, “Shadow Fux” was exhibited at The Swiss Institute in New York City. Ackermann received her first major survey exhibition in 2011 titled, "BAKOS," at the Ludwig Museum of Contemporary Art in Budapest.

In 2012, Ackermann was the subject of a mid-career retrospective at Museum of Contemporary Art, North Miami, curated by Bonnie Clearwater. The exhibition featured paintings, drawings, and collages from 1993 to 2012. In 2014, the Sammlung Friedrichshof in Austria held an exhibition titled, "Meditation on Violence” by Ackermann, which focused on a series of ‘chalkboard paintings’ which were the result of experimenting with pushing the boundaries of painting. A survey of the artist's ‘chalkboard paintings’ was held in 2016 at Malmö Konsthall in Sweden titled, “The Aesthetic of Disappearance”. An additional survey of Ackermann’s works in chalk titled, “Movements as Monuments” was held in 2018 at La Triennale di Milano. In 2019, Ackermann began to work on her Mama series, which she has continued through today. A series of “Mama” paintings will be shown alongside her earliest drawings and paintings created from 1993-1996, in an exhibition titled "HIDDEN" at MASI Lugano in March 2023.

Personal life
Rita Ackermann is married to artist Daniel Turner.

Publications 
 Kort, Pamela, Grau, Donatien, Bezzola, Tobia (et. al.), 'Rita Ackermann. Hidden', Milan: Mousse, Lugano: Museo d'arte della Svizzera italiana, 2023 (forthcoming)
 Jetzer, Gianni, Korine, Harmony, 'Rita Ackermann: Mama', Zurich: Hauser & Wirth Publishers, 2021
 Clearwater, Bonnie, Ensslin, Felix (et al.), 'Rita Ackermann', New York: Skira Rizzoli, 2011
 Orui, Makoto (ed.), 'Rita Ackermann. Keep my mouth shut and no headaches… Works 1996-1993', New York: Andrew Rosen Gallery, Tokyo: rockin’ on inc., 1997

 Ackermann, Rita, 'Sketchbook V (Twitchy)', New York: American Art Catalogues, 2022 
 Ackermann, Rita, 'Sketchbook IV (Frequencies of Freedom (Double Take)', New York: American Art Catalogues, 2022 
 Ackermann, Rita, 'Sketchbook III (7581)', New York: American Art Catalogues, 2022 
 Ackermann, Rita, 'Sketchbook II (A Midsummer Night’s Dream)', New York: American Art Catalogues, 2021 
 Ackermann, Rita, 'Sketchbook I (For Mama)', New York: American Art Catalogues, 2021 
 Ackermann, Rita, 'drawings',: Karma Publications, 2017 
 Ackermann, Rita, 'Meditation on Violence": Schlebrugge.Editor, 2016
 ‘Rita Ackermann and Harmony Korine. Shadow Fux’, Rita Ackermann with Harmony Korine, New York: Swiss Institute of Contemporary Art, 2011
 'Snowfall in August', Sittard: Museum Het Domein, 2002
 'Revelations', Rita Ackermann (art) with Byron Coley (story), Tokyo: Rockin' On, 1999

Selected solo exhibitions
 2023, MASI Lugano, 'Rita Ackermann. Hidden', Lugano, Switzerland
 2018, La Triennale di Milano, 'Rita Ackermann. Movements as Monuments', Milan, Italy
 2016, Malmö Konsthall, 'The Aesthetic of Disappearance', Malmö, Sweden
 2014, Sammlung Friedrichshof, 'Meditation on Violence-Hair Wash', Burgenland, Austria
 2012, Museum of Contemporary Art, ‘Rita Ackermann', Miami FL
 2011, Ludwig Museum, 'Rita Ackermann. Bakos', Budapest, Hungary
 2010, Swiss Institute, ‘Rita Ackermann and Harmony Korine: Shadow Fux’, New York NY
 2002, Museum Het Domein, ‘Snowfall in August’, Sittard, Netherlands
 1999, Swiss Institute, 'Rita Ackermann', New York NY

Selected public collections
 Dallas Museum of Art, Dallas, TX
 Denver Art Museum, Logan Collection, Denver, CO
 The Long Museum, West Bund, China
 The Maria Leuff Foundation, Columbia County, NY
 Marieluise Hessel Foundation, Bard College, New York, NY
 Museum het Domein, Sittard, Netherlands
 Museum of Contemporary Art North Miami, Miami, FL
 Museum of Contemporary Art, Los Angeles, CA
 Museum of Modern Art, New York, NY
 San Francisco Museum of Modern Art, San Francisco, CA
 Ståhl Collection, Norrköping, Sweden
 The Zabludowicz Collection, London, United Kingdom

References

External links 

 images of Ackermann's work on ArtNet
 Rita Ackermann by Josh Smith - BOMB Magazine
 Rita Ackermann
 Rita Ackermann
 The Body Gets Lost in the Gestures: Rita Ackermann in conversation with András Szántó, in The Burger Collection and Ursula Magazine, 2022
 Rita Ackermann at Andrea Rosen, Art in America, Nov, 2004 by Vincent Katz
 Teenarama: Rita Ackermann by Peter Schjeldahl, artnet.com
 Rita Ackermann at Andrea Rosen Gallery and The New Museum in 1994, by Keith Seward, Artforum
 Gean Moreno, "Rita Ackermann and the Traumas of War," ART PAPERS, Jul - Aug 2012, Issue 36.04, Atlanta GA, pp. 28 – 33. Published in 2017 in Ursula Magazine
 Rita Ackermann at the Parco Gallery by Monty DiPietrobr, assemblylanguage.com
 Ackermann at Rebecca M. Camhi Gallery, Athens, Greece
 Rita Ackermann Interview, Whitehot Magazine of Contemporary Art

1968 births
Living people
20th-century Hungarian women artists
21st-century Hungarian women artists
Artists from Budapest
Contemporary painters
Hungarian contemporary artists
Hungarian painters
Hungarian women painters
Hungarian University of Fine Arts alumni